The 1962 BC Lions finished the season in fourth place in the Western Conference with a 7–9 record and failed to make the playoffs. 

Dave Skrien's first full season as head coach saw drastic improvement from the one win team in 1961.   Joe Kapp lead the CFL in passing yards (3279), completions (197) and TD passes (17).  Bruising fullback Nub Beamer had a terrific season rushing for 1161 yards and duo threat tailback Willie Fleming had 925 yards rushing and 525 yards receiving.

Linebacker Tom Brown was the lone Lion on the CFL All-star team.

The Lions changed their helmets to include the now classic mountain lion claw logo.

Regular season

Season standings

Season schedule

Offensive leaders

1962 CFL Awards
LB – Tom Brown, CFL All-Star

References

BC Lions seasons
1962 Canadian Football League season by team
1962 in British Columbia